Al-Saydyah is a sub-district located in At Taffah District, Al Bayda Governorate, Yemen. Al-Saydyah had a population of 1251 according to the 2004 census.

References 

Sub-districts in At Taffah District